Paramussardia is a genus of longhorn beetles of the subfamily Lamiinae, containing the following species:

 Paramussardia bothai Breuning, 1981
 Paramussardia flavoscutellata Breuning, 1965

References

Pteropliini